Paul Lewis may refer to:
Paul Lewis (architect), American architect and professor at the Princeton University School of Architecture
Paul Lewis (broadcaster) (born 1948), British radio broadcaster and financial journalist
Paul Lewis (field hockey) (born 1966), Australian field hockey player
Paul Lewis (footballer) (born 1994), British association footballer
Paul Lewis (journalist) (born 1981), British newspaper journalist
Paul Lewis (professor), American professor of literature
Paul Lewis (pianist) (born 1972), English classical pianist
Paul Lewis (racing driver) (born 1932), American NASCAR driver
Paul Lewis (soccer) (born 1999), American association footballer (soccer player)
Paul Lewis, film producer of The Hot Spot
Paul A. Lewis (1879–1929), American pathologist at the University of Pennsylvania and the Rockefeller Institute
Paul H. Lewis, professor of political science at Tulane University
Paul M. Lewis (car builder) (died 1990), American entrepreneur and car builder
Paul M. Lewis (diplomat), appointed to help shutdown the Guantanamo prison
Paul M. Lewis, ethnographer, see Berber languages